The Päijänne Water Tunnel is a water tunnel located in Southern Finland.

The purpose of the tunnel is to provide fresh water for the over one million people of the Greater Helsinki area, including the cities of Helsinki, Espoo, Vantaa, Hyvinkää, Järvenpää, Kerava, Kauniainen, Kirkkonummi, Sipoo and Tuusula. The former Porvoo Rural Municipality, now merged with the municipality of Porvoo, also took part in the building of the scheme but has never drawn water from it for domestic use.

From there, the tunnel slopes slightly downhill allowing water to flow naturally with gravity. Water from the southern portion of Lake Päijänne is of good quality at the tunnel intake, and usually drinkable without processing. The tunnel ends at the  Silvola reservoir in Vantaa. From the reservoir, water is pumped to water treatment plants in Pitkäkoski and Vanhakaupunki. 

The construction of the tunnel started in 1972 and was completed in 1982, at a cost of approximately €200 million (adjusted for inflation). In 1999 and 2001, portions of the tunnel required repair due to rock falls. In 2008, the tunnel underwent an extensive renovation. The southern part of the tunnel was reinforced in order to prevent cave-ins. During the renovation, the Vantaa River was used as an alternative water supply for the Greater Helsinki area.

It takes approximately nine days for the water to traverse the length of the tunnel.



Gallery

See also
List of longest tunnels

References

External links
Finnish Tunnelling Association, Päijänne Water Tunnel
Pääkaupunkiseudun Vesi Oy

Water tunnels
Water supply and sanitation in Finland
Tunnels in Finland
Tunnels completed in 1982
Lake Päijänne
1982 establishments in Finland